Luis Gonzalo Bustamante (born December 11, 1985 in Ucacha) is an Argentine professional football player. Currently, he plays for the Chilean club Magallanes.

He first played on the professional level in Primera División Argentina for Instituto Atlético Central Córdoba.

External links
 Career summary by playerhistory.com

1985 births
Living people
Argentine footballers
Argentine expatriate footballers
Instituto footballers
Talleres de Córdoba footballers
Club Atlético Los Andes footballers
Chacarita Juniors footballers
Defensa y Justicia footballers
Atlético Tucumán footballers
All Boys footballers
Levadiakos F.C. players
Deportes Iquique footballers
Curicó Unido footballers
Argentine Primera División players
Championnat National players
Super League Greece players
Chilean Primera División players
Expatriate footballers in Chile
Expatriate footballers in France
Expatriate footballers in Greece
Argentine expatriate sportspeople in France
Association football midfielders
Footballers from Córdoba, Argentina